Geron Davis (born December 1, 1960) is a musician best known as a composer. He was first signed by Meadowgreen Music and best known for penning the song "Holy Ground". Davis married partner Becky Davis and have collectively written several songs which include, "In the Presence of Jehovah", "Mercy Saw Me", "Send It On Down", "Holy Of Holies", "Gentle Hands", "Peace Speaker", and "Something About My Praise". Davis, also a vocalist, asked his sister Alyson Lovern and her husband Shelton to join him and Becky in forming the group, "Kindred Souls" and have been performing together for more than ten years. They released their debut album, "Let It Rain," in 2002 which gained considerable attention on AC charts.

Works
Shine On - Geron Davis (featuring the Alexandria Sanctuary Choir) - 1985
Let It Shine - Geron Davis (featuring the Alexandria Sanctuary Choir) - 1985
Send It On Down - Geron Davis (featuring the Alexandria Sanctuary Choir) - 1993
Holy Ground - Geron Davis (featuring the Alexandria Sanctuary Choir) - 1987
Praisin'... Live - Geron Davis (featuring the Alexandria Sanctuary Choir - SpiritSong [a Division of Pathway Music]) - 1993
Send It On Down - Geron Davis (featuring the Alexandria Sanctuary Choir, Orchestrated by Lari Goss & J. Daniel Smith - Praise Gathering Music Group) - 1993
Holy Ground - Geron Davis  (Produced by Tom Brooks, Integrity's Hosanna! Music) - 1994
Portraits Of Worship Live, Volume 1 - Featuring Westgate Chapel (Producer/Worship Leader, Geron Davis - Spirit-Led Records) - 1998
It Took A Lamb - Geron Davis (Produced & Arranged by J. Daniel Smith - Integrity's Hosanna! Music) - 1999
WOW Worship: Orange - CD2 - March 28, 2000
Songs 4 Worship: Holy Ground - 2001
WOW Worship: The Platinum Collection - 2002
Let It Rain - Geron Davis & Kindred Souls (Daywind Records) - September 19, 2002
Hope Has Come - Geron Davis (Produced/Arranged by Bradley Knight - Integrity Media) - 2002
Song of Praise - Geron Davis (Arranged/Produced by Geron Davis & Bradley Knight - SpiritSound Music Group) - 2002
Closer - Geron Davis (Arranged/Produced by Geron Davis & Bradley Knight - Brentwood-Benson) - February 3, 2004
Sing Joy - Geron Davis (featuring Grace Baptist Worship Choir, Knoxville, TN) - June 14, 2005
Celebrate Jesus - Various Artists (Compilation Album - Integrity's Hosanna! Music) - 1999
Offer Up This Praise - Live in Denver (Featuring the Riverside Worship Choir, Denver, CO) - Geron Davis
Send It On Up - Geron Davis - (featuring the Mount Paran Church of God Festival Choir, Arranged/Produced by Geron Davis & J. Daniel Smith - Praise Gathering Music Group), 
Then & There, Settled & Done - Easter with Geron Davis
Cradle That Rocked the World: Christmas with the Christ Church prayZchoir - Geron Davis, Christopher Phillips, and Jukka Palonen (Benson Music) - 2008
Amen - Geron Davis (Integrity's Hosanna! Music) - 2008
He Is Great - Geron Davis & Kindred Souls (with the Mount Paran North New Life Singers - SpiritSound Music Group) - 2008
Hallelujah Jesus Is Born - Christmas with Geron Davis (Arranged/Orchestrated/Produced by Bradley Knight & Geron Davis - Benson Music) - 2008
Rejoice - Christmas Worship (Geron Davis - Worship Leader - Brentwood-Benson)   2009
A Night Of Hope - Christmas Worship • Geron Davis, Bradley Knight (featuring Randy Phillips, Dan Dean, Geron Davis, & Dave Clark - Lillenas Publishing)  2009
Everywhere - Worship with Geron Davis (Praise Band/Praise Team version - Brentwood-Benson) - 2010
All I Need - Worship with Geron Davis (Choir & Orch version - Brentwood-Benson) - 2010
Where Praise Begins - A Worship Collection -Geron Davis, Bradley Knight  (featuring Randy Phillips, Dan Dean, Geron Davis, & Dave Clark - Lillenas Publishing)  2011
Gone... A Resurrection Worship Experience - Geron Davis (Orchestrated by J. Daniel Smith, Feat. Clint Brown & The Central Sanctuary Choir - SpiritSound Music Group) - 2012
Let The Light Shine - David Scott (feat. Geron Davis, Track 1. Let The Light Shine) - 2012
Shalom - Jasmine Brady (feat. Geron Davis & Kindred Souls, Track 6. God Is In Control - Regeneration Music Group) - 2021

References

American performers of Christian music
Living people
1960 births
Musicians from Louisiana
People from Bogalusa, Louisiana